Kriulya is a rural locality (a village) in Markushevskoye Rural Settlement, Tarnogsky District, Vologda Oblast, Russia. The population was 42 as of 2002.

Geography 
Kriulya is located 23 km southeast of Tarnogsky Gorodok (the district's administrative centre) by road. Cherepanikha is the nearest rural locality.

References 

Rural localities in Tarnogsky District